Major General Nguyễn Ngọc Loan (11 December 193014 July 1998) was a South Vietnamese general and  chief of the South Vietnamese National Police.

Loan gained international attention when he summarily executed handcuffed prisoner Nguyễn Văn Lém, on February 1, 1968 in Saigon, Vietnam during the Tet Offensive. Nguyễn Văn Lém was a Viet Cong (VC) member. The event was witnessed and recorded by Võ Sửu, a cameraman for NBC, and Eddie Adams, an Associated Press photographer. The photo and film became two famous images in contemporary American journalism.

Early life 
Loan was born in 1930 to a middle-class family in Huế, and was one of eleven children. He studied pharmacy at Huế University before joining the Vietnamese National Army in 1951. He soon studied at an officer training school, where he befriended classmate Nguyễn Cao Kỳ. Loan received pilot training in Morocco before returning to Vietnam in 1955, serving with the Republic of Vietnam Air Force (RVNAF) for the next decade.

He received additional training in the United States at some point during this period, enabling him to speak English fluently by the time he rose to prominence in the late 1960s. Despite gradually taking on administrative tasks involving intelligence and security, Loan flew as wingman to Kỳ, now commander of the RVNAF, during the February 1965 Operation Flaming Dart airstrikes targeting North Vietnam.

Career
In June 1965, when Kỳ became prime minister of South Vietnam, he promoted Loan to colonel and appointed him director of the Military Security Service. This was followed within a few months by an appointment to director of the Central Intelligence Organization, giving Loan simultaneous control of both military intelligence and security. He was further made director general of the Republic of Vietnam National Police in April 1966. Holding these positions enabled Loan to wield immense power, and he supervised the suppression of the early 1966 uprising of Kỳ's rival General Nguyễn Chánh Thi and dissident Buddhists. When Kỳ agreed to become vice president to Nguyễn Văn Thiệu in 1967, the former relied on the support Loan provided for him in order to retain power.

Loan was a staunch South Vietnamese nationalist, refusing to give Americans special treatment in his jurisdiction. For example, in December 1966 he rejected the arrest of Saigon mayor Van Van Cua by American military police and insisted that only South Vietnamese authorities could arrest and detain South Vietnamese citizens. He also insisted that U.S. civilians, including journalists, fell under South Vietnamese jurisdiction while in Saigon. Loan's uncompromising stand caused him to be regarded as a troublemaker by the Presidency of Lyndon B. Johnson. Loan was also skeptical of the U.S. CIA-backed Phoenix Program to attack and neutralize the clandestine VC infrastructure.

Loan's men were also involved in the arrest of two VC operatives on 15 August 1967 who had been engaged in sending out peace feelers to U.S. officials behind the back of the South Vietnamese in an initiative code-named Buttercup. His stand against such "backdoor" dealing, and his opposition to releasing one of the communist negotiators, reportedly angered the Americans, and forced them to keep both him and the South Vietnamese better informed of diplomatic dealings involving their country.

Loan was an accomplished pilot—he led an airstrike on VC forces at Bù Đốp in 1967, shortly before he was promoted to permanent brigadier general rank. The Americans were displeased at his promotion, and Loan submitted his resignation shortly thereafter. The South Vietnamese cabinet subsequently rejected Loan's resignation.

Execution of Nguyễn Văn Lém

Nguyễn Văn Lém (also known as Bảy Lốp), was a VC member. On 1 February 1968, during the Tet Offensive, he was captured in a building in the Cho Lon quarter of Saigon, near the Ấn Quang pagoda. Lém wore civilian clothing at the time of his capture. Handcuffed, he was brought to Loan, who then summarily executed him on the street using his sidearm, a .38 Special Smith & Wesson Bodyguard, Model 49 revolver,   A reporter for the The New York Times later wrote that this likely violating the Geneva Conventions but this was unfounded.  Lém, dressed in civilian clothing and not carrying a rifle, did not look like a soldier and would not have qualified as a prisoner of war under the Geneva Conventions. Max Hastings, writing in 2018, said that Lém was alleged to have personally executed South Vietnamese Lt. Col. Nguyen Tuan, his wife, six children and the officer’s 80-year-old mother shortly prior; he also wrote that American historian Ed Moise "is convinced that the
entire story of Lém murdering the Tuan family is a post-war
invention" and that "The truth will never be known."

The execution was captured on photo by Associated Press photographer Eddie Adams and on video by NBC News television cameraman Võ Sửu.  After the execution, Loan told Adams: "They killed many of our people and many of yours." Võ Sửu reported that after the shooting Loan went to a reporter and said ''These guys kill a lot of our people, and I think Buddha will forgive me.''

Interviewed by Oriana Fallaci in May 1968 for her book Nothing, and So be it, he stated that he was aware of the indignation he caused and that he understood Fallaci's point of view when she regarded him as a cold-blooded killer. He said that he killed Lém because he felt enraged since the VC was wearing civilian clothes. Speaking to Fallaci, he said: "He wasn't wearing a uniform and I can't respect a man who shoots without wearing a uniform. Because it's too easy: you kill and you're not recognized. I respect a North Vietnamese because he's dressed as a soldier, like myself, and so he takes the same risks as I do. But a Vietcong in civilian clothes - I was filled with rage."

The photograph and footage were broadcast worldwide, galvanizing the anti-war movement. Eddie Adams' photo  won Adams the 1969 Pulitzer Prize for Spot News Photography. Adams later stated he regretted he was unable to get a picture "of that Viet Cong [Lém] blowing away the [Tuan] family".

A few months after the execution picture was taken, Loan was seriously wounded near Saigon by machine gun fire that led to the amputation of his leg. Again his picture hit the world press, this time as Australian war correspondent Pat Burgess carried him back to his lines. He was evacuated to Australia and then to the United States. Afterwards, Loan remained in the United States for an extended period as Thiệu consolidated his power by replacing Kỳ supporters. Upon his return to Saigon, he was appointed to a position that involved long-range planning, but lacked actual power.

Later life 
In 1975, during the fall of Saigon, Loan fled South Vietnam to the United States. There he moved to Dale City, Virginia. He then opened a restaurant called "Les Trois Continents" in the Washington, D.C. suburb of Burke, Virginia at Rolling Valley Mall. The restaurant served hamburgers, Vietnamese cuisine, and pizza, but was described as more of a pizzeria. Loan also worked as a secretary in a Washington firm at this time. When interviewed, Loan stated "All we want to do is to forget and to be left alone."

Adams later apologized in person to Loan and his family for the damage his photograph did to his reputation.

House of Representatives member Elizabeth Holtzman forwarded a list of Vietnamese officials who may have committed crimes (including Loan) to Immigration and Naturalization Service (INS). House of Representatives member Harold S. Sawyer later requested the Library of Congress investigate Loan. In 1978, the INS contended that Loan had committed a war crime, following a report by the Library of Congress which concluded that the summary execution of Nguyễn Văn Lém had been illegal under Vietnamese law, in an attempt to revoke his permanent resident status to ensure that he could not become a United States citizen. They approached Adams to testify against Loan, but Adams instead testified in his favor and Loan was allowed to stay. The deportation was halted by the intervention of United States President Jimmy Carter, who stated that "such historical revisionism was folly".

Loan visited the Vietnam Veterans Memorial and praised it.

In 1991, he closed his restaurant and retired after a decline in business following increased publicity about his past. Adams recalled that on his last visit to the pizza parlor shortly before it closed, he had seen written on a toilet wall, "We know who you are, you fucker".

Death 
Nguyễn Ngọc Loan died of cancer on 14 July 1998, aged 67, in Burke, Virginia. After his death, Adams praised him: "The guy was a hero. America should be crying. I just hate to see him go this way, without people knowing anything about him."

Eddie Adams wrote a eulogy to Loan in Time:The general killed the Viet Cong; I killed the general with my camera. Still photographs are the most powerful weapon in the world. People believe them, but photographs do lie, even without manipulation. They are only half-truths. What the photograph didn't say was, "What would you do if you were the general at that time and place on that hot day, and you caught the so-called bad guy after he blew away one, two or three American soldiers?"

Personal life
Loan was married to Chinh Mai, with whom he raised five children.

References

External links
 
  Collection of photos of the Lém execution.
The exact location of this event happened on the west section of "Lý Thái Tổ" street, right  in the center of this satellite map, and looking East as shown in the execution picture.

1930 births
1998 deaths
Vietnamese amputees
Generals of South Vietnam
Deaths from cancer in Virginia
Chiefs of police
People notable for being the subject of a specific photograph
Vietnam War photographs
Vietnamese anti-communists
Vietnamese emigrants to the United States
People from Burke, Virginia
People from Huế